Olivier Megaton (born Olivier Fontana; 6 August 1965) is a French director, writer, and editor who directed the films The Red Siren, Transporter 3, Colombiana, and Taken 2, and Taken 3.

Early life
Fontana was born in Paris, 20 years to the day after the atomic bombing of Hiroshima, and his choice of the artistic name, Megaton, was influenced by this. He grew up in a Paris banlieue, and after qualifying for a diploma in psychology, was active as a graphic artist and also adept in graffiti art.  After meeting music video director Jean-Baptiste Mondino, he started working in films. Fontana first started making shorts and video clips before finally directing feature films.

He is of Italian descent.

Career
Fontana has directed Exit, The Red Siren, Transporter 3, Taken 2, and Taken 3. Transporter 3 and Taken 2 received scores of 36% and 21%, respectively, on the critic-aggregator site Rotten Tomatoes. He was chosen to direct Mathilda, the sequel to Léon, but expressed the opinion that the film was unlikely to be made. He also served as a second unit director for the film Hitman. His trademark technique in film directing involves intentionally disorienting camerawork and editing.

Aside from film making, Fontana is also a published author after his novel, entitled Le Facteur humain ("The Human Factor"), was released in 1998. In 2021, Fontana returned to film production to release a Netflix documentary entitled "Monsters Inside: The 24 Faces of Billy Milligan", the documentary received criticism shortly after release for its stigmatism regarding dissociative identity disorder.

Filmography

Feature films
Director
 Tout morose (1998)
 Exit (2000)
 The Red Siren (2002) (Also writer)
 Transporter 3 (2008)
 Colombiana (2011)
 Taken 2 (2012)
 Taken 3 (2014)
 The Last Days of American Crime (2020)

Second unit director
 Hitman (2007)
 Transporter 3 (2008)

Short films

Television

References

External links
 Olivier Megaton Official Website
 

1965 births
Living people
Film directors from Paris
French people of Corsican descent
French people of Italian descent